Al Edwards (born May 18, 1967) is a former American football wide receiver in the NFL for the Buffalo Bills. He played college football at Northwestern State University.

References

1967 births
Living people
American football wide receivers
Northwestern State Demons football players
Buffalo Bills players
Players of American football from New Orleans